Martin & Reid of Bishopsgate were a British publisher of the 1940s. They produced children's comics such as Jolly Chuckles, Merry-go-round and Fun Fare (1946).

Titles
 The Mascot - All Sport Boys Magazine 1950s

References

Comic book publishing companies of the United Kingdom